Paul Hahnel (17 April 1843, Schlegenburg in Leobsanütz, Silesia - 12 May 1887, Manicore) 
He collected Lepidoptera and Coleoptera in Venezuela (1877/79) and made two  Amazon expeditions the first 1879-1884) and the second, with Otto Michael 1885/87). His collection was sold to  Otto Staudinger and Andreas Bang-Haas

Based on Hahnel's collection of frogs from Yurimaguas, Peru, George Albert Boulenger described eight new species and named one of them, Ameerega hahneli, after him.

References

Fassl, A. H. 1921 [Hahnel, P.] Ent. Z. 35(13) 49-50. 
Lamas, G. 1981 [Hahnel, P.] Rev. Per. Ent. 23 1980(1) 25-31.  
Staudinger, O. 1890: [Hahnel, P.]  Dt. Ent. Z. Iris 3(1) 128-132.

1843 births
1887 deaths
German entomologists